Victoria Rusakova (born 23 October 1988 Sverdlovsk) is a Russian volleyball player.

She played for the Women's National Team at the 2013 FIVB Women's World Grand Champions Cup. and the 2013 Summer Universiade,

She plays for Leningradka Saint Petersburg.

References

External links 

 
 
 http://www.russiavolley.com/4233/victoria-chaplina-moves-from-uralochka-to-dinamo-kazan/
 

1988 births
Living people
Russian women's volleyball players
Universiade gold medalists for Russia
Universiade medalists in volleyball